In chemistry, a diradical is a molecular species with two electrons occupying molecular orbitals (MOs) which are degenerate.  The term "diradical" is mainly used to describe organic compounds, where most diradicals are extremely reactive and in fact rarely isolated. Diradicals are even-electron molecules but have one fewer bond than the number permitted by the octet rule. 

Examples of diradical species can also be found in coordination chemistry, for example among bis(1,2-dithiolene) metal complexes.

Spin states
Diradicals are usually triplets. The phrases singlet and triplet are derived from the multiplicity of states of diradicals in electron spin resonance: a singlet diradical has one state (S = 0, Ms = 2*0+1 = 1, ms = 0) and exhibits no signal in EPR and a triplet diradical has 3 states (S = 1, Ms = 2*1+1 = 3, ms = -1; 0; 1) and shows in EPR 2 peaks (if no hyperfine splitting). The triplet state has total spin quantum number S = 1  and is paramagnetic. Therefore, diradical species display a triplet state when the two electrons are unpaired and display the same spin. When the unpaired electrons with opposite spin are antiferromagnetically coupled, diradical species can display a singlet state (S = 0) and be diamagnetic.

Examples 
Stable, isolable, diradicals include singlet oxygen and triplet oxygen. Other important diradicals are certain carbenes, nitrenes, and their main group elemental analogues. Lesser known diradicals are nitrenium ions, carbon chains and organic so-called non-Kekulé molecules in which the electrons reside on different carbon atoms. Main group cyclic structures can also exhibit diradicals, such as disulfur dinitride, or diradical character, such as diphosphadiboretanes. In inorganic chemistry, both homoleptic and heteroleptic 1,2-dithiolene complexes of d8 transition metal ions show a large degree of diradical character in the ground state.

References

Further reading 
 
 
 

Organic chemistry
Inorganic chemistry
Magnetism